Karel Stibor (5 November 1923 in Prague, Czechoslovakia – 8 November 1948 in La Manche) was an ice hockey player for the Czechoslovakian national team. He won a silver medal at the 1948 Winter Olympics.

He died in an air crash, when the airplane carrying the Czechoslovakian ice hockey national team fell into the English Channel on a flight from Paris to London.

References

External links

1923 births
1948 deaths
Ice hockey players at the 1948 Winter Olympics
Medalists at the 1948 Winter Olympics
Olympic ice hockey players of Czechoslovakia
Olympic medalists in ice hockey
Olympic silver medalists for Czechoslovakia
Ice hockey people from Prague
Victims of aviation accidents or incidents in Europe
Victims of aviation accidents or incidents in international waters
Victims of aviation accidents or incidents in 1948
Czech ice hockey centres
Czechoslovak ice hockey centres